Echinocandin B, a lipopeptide, is a naturally occurring cyclic hexapeptide with a linoleoyl side chain. It belongs to a class of antifungal agents called echinocandins, which inhibits the synthesis of glucan, a major component of the fungal cell wall, via noncompetitive inhibition of a crucial enzyme, β-(1→3)-D-glucan synthase. Echinocandin B is a fermentation product of Aspergillus nidulans and the closely related species, A. rugulosus; discovered in 1974 in A. nidulans var. echinulatus strain A 32204 in Germany, it was the first of the echinocandin class of antifungals.

Echinocandin B can undergo deacylation (removal of the lipid side chain) by the action of a deacylase enzyme from the filamentous bacterium Actinoplanes utahensis, which catalyzes the cleavage of the linoleoyl side chain; in three subsequent synthetic steps, including a chemical reacylation, the antifungal drug anidulafungin is synthesized.

References

External links
 

Antifungals
Echinocandins
Hexapeptides
Cyclic peptides